Warangal Police Commissionerate is a city police force with primary responsibilities in law enforcement and investigation within the districts of Hanamkonda, Warangal district and Jangaon.

Building 
The foundation stone was laid for a new police commissionerate building with latest technology.

References 

Telangana Police
Year of establishment missing